Margaret Armour (10 September 1860 – 13 October 1943) was a Scottish poet, novelist, and translator. She translated the Nibelungenlied from Middle High German into English prose, first published in 1897 as The Fall of the Nibelungs. In 1910 she translated The Ring of the Nibelung by Richard Wagner, and in 1928 she translated Gudrun.

Selected works

Prose 
 The Home and Early Haunts of Robert Louis Stevenson (1895)
 Agnes of Edinburgh (1910)

Poetry
 Songs of Love and Death (1896)
 Thames Sonnets and Semblances (1897)
 The Shadow of Love and Other Poems (1898)

Translations
 (Armour translated vols. 10–12.)

References

External links 
 The Fall of the Nibelungs, translated by Armour, at Project Gutenberg
 
 

1860 births
1943 deaths
Scottish poets
Scottish translators